Corina Casanova (born 4 January 1956) is a Swiss politician who was the Federal Chancellor of Switzerland between 2008 and 2015.

Born in Ilanz, Graubünden, Casanova worked as a lawyer in the practice of the former President of the Swiss Federal Supreme Court, Giusep Nay, as well as a Red Cross delegate in South Africa, Angola, Nicaragua and El Salvador.  She was also a federal parliamentary official and advisor to Federal Councillors Flavio Cotti and Joseph Deiss, both of the Christian Democratic People's Party.

In August 2005, she was elected to the office of Vice-Chancellor by the Swiss Federal Assembly. In December 2007,  that assembly elected her to the office of Chancellor in the course of the 2007 Swiss Federal Council election. In March 2008 she was designated by the Swiss Federal Council member of the directional committee for electronic government in Switzerland.

Casanova is a member of the Christian Democratic People's Party and speaks six languages: Romansh, German, French, Italian, English, and Spanish.

References

Official biography

|-

Federal Chancellors of Switzerland
1956 births
Living people
Christian Democratic People's Party of Switzerland politicians
People from Surselva District
University of Fribourg alumni
21st-century Swiss women politicians
21st-century Swiss politicians